The One and Only Buddy Goode is the second studio album by Michael Carr's comedy character Buddy Goode. It was officially released both digitally and on CD in store on 11 August 2011.

The album was nominated for an ARIA Award in the category of Best Comedy Release at the 2011 ceremony, however was beaten by Australian comedy duo Hamish & Andy's compilation album Celebrating 50 Glorious Years.

On 18 January 2013, the album was re-released into select stores as a double pack with Goode's debut album, It's All Goode.

Track listing

References

External links
Official Website
CD Edition
iTunes Edition

2011 albums
Buddy Goode albums